Percnon is a genus of crabs. It is "doubtfully placed" in the family Plagusiidae, and it has also been included in the family Grapsidae.

Species
Seven species are recognised:
Percnon abbreviatum (Dana, 1851)
Percnon affine (Milne-Edwards, 1853)
Percnon gibbesi (Milne-Edwards, 1853)
Percnon guinotae Crosnier, 1965
Percnon pascuensis Retamal, 2002
Percnon planissimum (Herbst, 1804)
Percnon sinense Chen, 1977

References

Grapsoidea
Taxa named by Johannes von Nepomuk Franz Xaver Gistel
Crustacean genera